Paul St. Peter is an American voice actor, who works on English-language productions of Japanese anime shows. He voiced Punch in Cowboy Bebop: The Movie, Mondego in Gankutsuou: The Count of Monte Cristo, Kurama in Naruto, Razor in Hunter × Hunter, Yammy in Bleach, Jorgun in Gurren Lagann, and Higa in Durarara!!,  and can be heard as various Digimon (the most recognized being Leomon). Some of his notable roles in video games include: Xemnas in the Kingdom Hearts series and Yuan Shao in Dynasty Warriors.

Filmography

Anime

 009 Re:Cyborg - Dr. Issac Gilmore
 Bleach - Grand Fisher, Yammy Riyalgo
 Bobobo-bo Bo-bobo - Captain Battleship, Roman Samurai, Bebebe-be Be-bebe, Dark Yasha
 Cowboy Bebop - Punch, Mark Rather, Cop
 Digimon Data Squad - Keramon/Kurisarimon (8), SaberLeomon, MetalPhantomon (15)
 Durarara!! - Anri's Father, Higa
 Edens Zero - Captain Connor
 Gankutsuou - Fernand de Morcerf
 Heat Guy J - Rhine
 Kekkaishi - Koya
 Last Exile - Arthur Campbell
 The Mystery of Mamo - Howard Lockewood/Mamo
 Mobile Suit Gundam 0080: War in the Pocket - Mikhail Kaminsky 
 Naruto - Kurama, Jirocho Wasabi, Koumei
 Naruto Shippuden - Kurama
 Overman King Gainer - Shinjin
 Rurouni Kenshin - Saizuchi
 Saiyuki Reload - Dokugakuji
 Saiyuki Reload Gunlock - Dokugakuji
 Samurai Champloo - Bundai (Ep. 18) 
 Shinzo - King Daku, Additional Voices
 Superior Defender Gundam Force - Tallgeese, Gun Bike, Gundiver-01, Zakrello Gate
 Stitch! - Leroy
 Time of Eve - Shimei
 Twelve Kingdoms - Kantai
 Witch Hunter Robin - Hiroshi Honma, Kiyoshi Matsunaga
 Zetman - Dr. Sugita (as George C. Cole)

Animation

Film

Live action
 Adventures in Voice Acting - Himself
 Icons - Himself (ep 119)
 Power Rangers: Zeo - Tritor (voice, uncredited)
 Stick it in Me - The Transvestite
 Tim And Eric Awesome Show, Great Job
 Versus - Jacket

Video games

 Baten Kaitos Origins - Nollin
 Bleach: The 3rd Phantom - Yammy Riyalgo
 Diablo III: Reaper of Souls - Additional Voices
 Digimon All-Star Rumble - Wormmon/Stingmon, Imperialdramon Fighter Mode
 Digimon World Data Squad - Barbamon, Leviamon, Ravemon
 Fire Emblem Heroes - Gregor
 Kingdom Hearts HD 1.5 Remix - Xemnas
 Kingdom Hearts HD 2.5 Remix - Xemnas
 Majin and the Forsaken Kingdom - Majin Taotl 
 Mortal Kombat vs. DC Universe - Narrator
 Mortal Kombat: Armageddon - Taven, Havik, Nightwolf
 Mortal Kombat: Deception - Havik, Nightwolf, Hotaru
 Soulcalibur V

References

External links 
 
 
 Paul St. Peter, George C. Cole, and Francis C. Cole at Crystal Acids Voice Actor Database
 

Living people
American male video game actors
American male voice actors
20th-century American male actors
21st-century American male actors
Year of birth missing (living people)